Berndt Häppling (29 April 1917 - 10 November 2014) was a Swedish sprint canoer who competed in the early 1950s. He won two medals at the 1950 ICF Canoe Sprint World Championships in Copenhagen with a gold in the K-4 1000 m and a silver in the K-2 500 m events.

References
 
 

2014 deaths
Swedish male canoeists
1917 births
ICF Canoe Sprint World Championships medalists in kayak